A papal conclave was held on 18 and 19 April 2005 to elect a successor to John Paul II, who had died on 2 April 2005. Upon the pope's death, the cardinals of the Catholic Church who were in Rome met and set a date for the beginning of the conclave. Of the 117 eligible members of the College of Cardinals, those younger than 80 years of age at the time of the death of Pope John Paul II, all but two attended. After several days of private meetings attended by both cardinal electors and non-voting cardinals, the conclave began on 18 April 2005. It ended the following day after four ballots with the election of Cardinal Joseph Ratzinger, Dean of the College of Cardinals and Prefect of the Congregation for the Doctrine of the Faith. After accepting his election, he took the name Benedict XVI.

Procedures
Pope John Paul II laid out new procedures for the election of his successor in his Apostolic Constitution Universi Dominici gregis in 1996. It detailed the roles of the cardinals and support personnel, the scheduling of the conclave, the text of oaths, penalties for violating secrecy, and many details, even the shape of the ballots ("the ballot paper must be rectangular in shape").  He denied the cardinals the right to choose a pope by acclamation or by assigning the election to a select group of cardinals.  He established new voting procedures the cardinals could follow if the balloting continued for several days, but those were not invoked in this conclave.  He maintained the rule established by Paul VI that cardinals who reached the age of eighty before the day the pope died would not participate in the balloting.

In previous conclaves, the cardinal electors lived in the Sistine Chapel precincts throughout the balloting.  Conditions were spartan and difficult for those with health problems.  Showers and bathroom facilities were shared and sleeping areas separated by curtains. John Paul kept the voting in the Sistine Chapel, but provided for the cardinal electors when not balloting to live, dine, and sleep in air-conditioned individual rooms in Domus Sanctae Marthae, better known by its Italian name Casa Santa Marta, a five-story guesthouse, completed in 1996, that normally serves as a guesthouse for visiting clergy.

The cardinals departed from his instructions only in that they did not assemble in the Pauline Chapel.  Restoration work begun in 2002 required a change of venue, and they used the Hall of Blessings instead.

The cardinal electors

Although there were 183 cardinals in all, cardinals aged 80 years or more at the time the papacy fell vacant were ineligible to vote in the conclave, according to rules established by Pope Paul VI in 1970 and modified slightly in 1996 by John Paul II. At the time of John Paul's death, there were 117 cardinals under the age of 80.

The cardinal electors came from slightly over fifty nations, a slight increase from the 49 represented at the 1978 conclave. About 30 of those countries had a single participant. The Italian electors were the most numerous at twenty, while the United States had the second largest group with 11. Poor health prevented two of the 117 cardinal electors from attending: Jaime Sin of the Philippines and Adolfo Antonio Suárez Rivera of Mexico. All the electors were appointed by Pope John Paul II except for three: Jaime Sin, who was not attending, William Wakefield Baum and Joseph Ratzinger, making Baum and Ratzinger the only participants with previous conclave experience from the two conclaves of 1978. With 115 cardinals electors participating, this conclave saw the largest number of cardinals ever to elect a pope, a number later matched by the 2013 conclave. Both conclaves in 1978 had 111 electors. The required two-thirds majority needed to elect a pope in 2005 was 77 votes.

Pre-conclave activities

In the nine-day period of mourning following the funeral services for John Paul II, many cardinals attended a Mass celebrated each day by a senior cleric, often a cardinal elector or papabile, who had the opportunity to preach a homily. Celebrants included Bernard Law, Camillo Ruini, Jorge Medina, Eugênio de Araújo Sales, Nasrallah Pierre Sfeir, Leonardo Sandri, and Piergiorgio Silvano Nesti.

On Saturday, 9 April, in Rome, 130 cardinals meeting in the "General Congregation", including some non-voting cardinals, agreed to Ratzinger's proposal that, while it would be unfair for a majority to restrict anyone's right to speak to the press, they might agree to such a restriction unanimously. In La Repubblica, veteran journalist Gad Lerner wrote that preventing "public reflection" by the cardinals "mutes their relationship to the world", deprives them of a "beneficial antidote to excessive scheming", increases the influence of the Curia. He cited "the fertility of ideas" generated by public discussion during the two 1978 conclaves.

Presiding over the pre-conclave events was the Dean of the College of Cardinals, Cardinal Ratzinger. For the first several days discussions were conducted largely in Italian, putting some cardinals at a disadvantage. Ratzinger responded to complaints by organizing simultaneous translation. On 14 April, in one of the daily general congregations, they heard the first of two mandated exhortations. The preacher was Raniero Cantalamessa, a Capuchin friar and Church history scholar, who had for several years preached the Lenten sermons to the Pope and his staff.

On 15 April, officials and personnel who were not cardinal-electors but had duties during the conclave formally took the oath of secrecy The oath bound them to secrecy about anything they would observe in the course of their duties throughout the conclave, under pain of punishment at the discretion of the incoming pope. The oath was administered in the Hall of Blessings in the presence of the Camerlengo Cardinal Eduardo Martínez Somalo and two masters of ceremonies.

One round of balloting was to be held the first evening. Then balloting was to continue until a new Pope was elected, with two ballots each morning and two each afternoon. The traditional procedure is that the ballots are burned, in times past reinforced by adding handfuls of dry or damp straw, to produce white smoke for a conclusive vote or black smoke for an inconclusive one. The straw had been replaced by chemically produced smoke. The ballot slips were to be burned at 12:00 and 19:00, Rome time (10:00 and 17:00 UTC) each day.

Conclave day one
On 18 April, the cardinals assembled in St. Peter's Basilica in the morning to concelebrate the mass Pro Eligendo Romano Pontifice (For the Election of the Roman Pontiff). As Dean of the College of Cardinals, Cardinal Joseph Ratzinger was the principal concelebrant. He chose to give the homily himself. In the afternoon, the cardinals assembled in the Hall of Blessings for the procession to the Sistine Chapel. The cardinals proceeded to the Sistine Chapel while the Litany of Saints was chanted. After taking their places the "Veni Creator Spiritus" ("Come, Creator Spirit") was sung. Cardinal Ratzinger read the oath. Each cardinal elector beginning with Ratzinger, followed by Vice Dean Angelo Sodano and the other cardinals in order of seniority, affirmed the oath by placing his hands on the book of the Gospels saying aloud: "And I, [name], do so promise, pledge and swear. So help me God and these Holy Gospels which I touch with my hand."

Archbishop Piero Marini (the Papal Master of Ceremonies) intoned the words extra omnes (Latin, "everybody out!"), the members of the choir, security guards, and others left the chapel and the doors of the Sistine Chapel were closed. Cardinal Tomáš Špidlík, a non-elector and a Jesuit theologian, delivered the second required exhortation. He and Marini then left.

First ballot
All discussions of the balloting are speculative. On the first ballot, according to the Italian daily Il Messaggero, Carlo Maria Martini, the archbishop of Milan, obtained 40 votes, Ratzinger obtained 38 votes, and Camillo Ruini a substantial number of votes, the rest of the votes being dispersed.

An anonymous cardinal provided his diary to an Italian journalist in September 2005 and it was published in full in 2011. That source gives the results of the first ballot as:

Joseph Ratzinger – 47 votes 
Jorge Mario Bergoglio – 10 votes 
Carlo Maria Martini – 9 votes 
Camillo Ruini – 6 votes 
Angelo Sodano – 4 votes 
Oscar Maradiaga – 3 votes 
Dionigi Tettamanzi – 2 votes 
Giacomo Biffi – 1 vote 
Others – 33 votes

At 20:05 local time, a thin white plume of smoke seemed for a moment to indicate the election was already over, and the 40,000 people who had spent the afternoon watching the ceremonies on large screens in St. Peter's Square broke into applause and song. But the smoke quickly grew stronger and clearly dark. The crowd quieted and cleared in a matter of minutes.

Conclave day two
The two ballots on the morning of the second day failed to result in an election. The results of the second ballot, according to the anonymous cardinal's diary, were:

Ratzinger – 65 votes 
Bergoglio – 35 votes
Sodano – 4 votes 
Tettamanzi – 2 votes 
Biffi – 1 vote
Others – 8 votes

The results of the third ballot, according to the anonymous cardinal's diary, were:

Ratzinger – 72 votes 
Bergoglio – 40 votes 
Darío Castrillón Hoyos – 1 vote 
Others – 2 votes

Tens of thousands of people waiting in St Peter's Square reacted with timid applause and then silence a little before noon when smoke of indeterminate color appeared and the lack of bell-ringing indicated that the morning's ballotting was inconclusive. Press speculation held that "a pope who was elected tonight at the fourth-fifth ballot or tomorrow morning at the sixth-seventh would still be a pontiff elected promptly. Beyond that perhaps some problems might arise."

By this point, Cardinal Ratzinger had emerged as a strong contender for the papacy, and recounted in an April 2005 audience to German pilgrims that he felt as though he was beneath the metaphorical axe of papal election, and his head began to spin. However, a fellow cardinal, later revealed to be Christoph Schönborn, encouraged Ratzinger, reminding him of his quotation of the Calling of Matthew in his funeral homily for John Paul II and applying it to Ratzinger.

The results of the fourth ballot, according to the anonymous cardinal's diary, were:

Ratzinger – 84 votes 
Bergoglio – 26 votes 
Biffi – 1 vote 
Bernard Law – 1 vote 
Christoph Schönborn – 1 vote
Others – 2 votes

Election results
Given that Ratzinger, Dean of the College, was elected pope, Angelo Sodano as the vice-dean performed the dean's role and asked Ratzinger if he would accept the election and what name he would adopt.

As the voting slips and notes were burnt after that ballot, "All of a sudden, the whole Sistine Chapel was filled with smoke", according to Adrianus Johannes Simonis. Christoph Schönborn joked: "Fortunately, there were no art historians present."

At 15:50 UTC, white smoke rose above the Sistine Chapel. The bells of St. Peter's pealed at about 16:10 UTC.

At 16:43 UTC, Cardinal Protodeacon, Jorge Medina, emerged on the balcony of St. Peter's Basilica and announced the election of Cardinal Ratzinger and that he had chosen the name Benedict XVI.

See also
Papabile

Notes

References

Sources

External links
Vacancy of the Apostolic See (official website)
Universi Dominici gregis – the rules governing the election
"Papal chase", 15 October 2003 (Slate.com)

 
2005
2005
2005
papal
papal
papal
papal
Political history of Vatican City